The Finals, formerly known as World Group, was the highest level of Davis Cup competition in 2019. It was held on indoor hard courts at the Caja Mágica in Madrid, Spain from 18 until 24 November. The ties were contested in a best-of-three rubbers format and were played on one day. There were two singles followed by a doubles.

Croatia were the defending champions, but were eliminated during the round robin stage.

Spain won the title, defeating Canada in the final, 2–0. It was the Spanish men's national tennis team's first Davis Cup title since 2011 and their sixth Davis Cup title overall. Rafael Nadal was named the Most Valuable Player of the tournament after winning all eight of his matches.

Participating teams
18 nations took part in the Finals.

The qualification were as follows:
 4 semifinalists of the previous edition
 2 wild card teams, selected by the Organising Committee that did not have to participate in the Qualifying Round 
 12 winners of the Qualifying Round, in February 2019

Overview
H = Host Nation, TH = Title Holder, WC = Wild Card

Seeds
The seedings were based on the Davis Cup Ranking of 4 February. The top six nations were seeded and drawn into position 1 across groups A-F, the nations ranked from 7 to 12 were drawn randomly into position 2, the remaining nations were drawn randomly into position 3.

  (Round robin)
  (Round robin)
  (Quarterfinals)
  (Round robin)
  (Semifinals)
  (Round robin)
  (Champion)
  (Quarterfinals)
  (Quarterfinals)
  (Round robin)
  (Quarterfinals)
  (Round robin)
  (Final)
  (Round robin)
  (Round robin)
  (Round robin)
  (Semifinals)
  (Round robin)

Team nominations

Each nation had to submit a team of up to five players at least 20 days before the Monday of the week of the event. If a player became injured or ill severely enough to prevent his participation in the tournament before his team's first match, he would be replaced by another player.

Format
The 18 teams are divided in six round robin groups of three teams each. The six group winners plus the two second-placed teams with the best records based on percentage of matches won (followed by percentage of sets won and then percentage of games won), will qualify for the quarterfinals.

Group stage

Overview
T = Ties, M = Matches, S = Sets

Group A

France vs. Japan

Serbia vs. Japan

France vs. Serbia

Group B

Croatia vs. Russia

Spain vs. Russia

Croatia vs. Spain

Group C

Argentina vs. Chile

Argentina vs. Germany

Germany vs. Chile

Group D

Belgium vs. Colombia

Australia vs. Colombia

Belgium vs. Australia 

Note: Gillé/Vliegen's retirement victory over Peers/Thompson counted as a 6–1, 6–0 win.

Group E

Kazakhstan vs. Netherlands

Great Britain vs. Netherlands

Great Britain vs. Kazakhstan

Group F

Italy vs. Canada

United States vs. Canada 

Note: Querrey/Sock's walkover victory over Pospisil/Shapovalov counted as a 6–0, 6–0 win.

United States vs. Italy

Knockout stage

Bracket

Quarterfinals

Australia vs. Canada

Serbia vs. Russia

Great Britain vs. Germany

Argentina vs. Spain

Semifinals

Russia vs. Canada

Great Britain vs. Spain

Final

Canada vs. Spain

References

External links
Official website

Finals
Davis Cup Finals
Davis Cup Finals
Davis Cup Finals